The Unknown Guest may refer to:

 The Unknown Guest (1931 film), German film
 The Unknown Guest (1943 film), American film